Harold Fisher may refer to:
Harold Fisher (politician) (1877–1928), Canadian politician and mayor of Ottawa
Harold H. Fisher (1901–2005), American church architect
Harold Henry Fisher (1890–1975), American historian
Harold W. Fisher (1903–1986), philatelist

See also
Harry Fisher (disambiguation)
Harold Fischer (1925–2009), U.S. Air Force fighter pilot